Kluz is the surname of the following people
Edward Kluz (born in 1980), British painter and illustrator
Franjo Kluz (1913-1944), Yugoslav pilot and People's Hero
Kenneth Kluz (born in 1956), Canadian provincial politician

See also
KLUZ-TV, Albuquerque virtual television channel
Kluz PS-11, sport parachute